Nyctibatrachus minor is a species of frog in the family Nyctibatrachidae endemic to the Western Ghats, India. 
Its natural habitats are subtropical or tropical moist lowland forest, subtropical or tropical moist montane forest, and rivers.  It is threatened by habitat loss.

References

Nyctibatrachus
Frogs of India
Endemic fauna of the Western Ghats
Taxonomy articles created by Polbot
Amphibians described in 1984